Jeremy "Jay" Dewitte is an American former funeral procession escort provider and convicted sex offender and police impersonator. He has been jailed multiple times for repeatedly impersonating police officers among other crimes.

Career 
Dewitte operated Metro State Vehicle Protection Services which provided vehicle escorts to funeral processions.

Legal issues 
Dewitte was charged in 2001 with impersonating a police officer. His impersonation of a police officer in 2003 resulted in an almost two year state jail sentence. He has been a registered sex offender since 2005. In 2009, he was sentenced to an extra four years in jail for breaching parole stipulations, although he was released early in October 2011.

In 2018, Dewitte was criminally charged for failing to register as a sex offender. In October 2019, he was arrested by the Orange County Sheriff's Department for impersonating a police officer in Windermere. Dewitte was accused of "wearing a shirt with a police badge, a bullet-resistant vest and a helmet with a police-like badge while he worked a funeral procession". In November 2019, he was accused of impersonating a police officer a third time. In March 2021, he was arrested again for impersonating a police officer. Dewitte had an imitation pistol when arrested. In September 2021 he was sentenced to 18 months in prison, had his driving license suspended for six months, and sentenced to four years of probation.

In November 2022, Dewitte was again arrested by Osceola County Sheriff's Department for Violation of Probation.

Media appearances 
In February 2021, Dewitte appeared on Dr. Phil.

Personal life 
Dewitte is from Central Florida.

References

External links 

 Metro State Services - Facebook page

Criminals from Florida
21st-century American criminals
Prisoners and detainees of Florida
Motorcycling people
Year of birth missing (living people)
Living people